Jabrabad may refer to:
 Jabrabad, Kermanshah
 Jabrabad, Khuzestan
 Jabrabad, Sistan and Baluchestan